Blodwen is a Welsh girl's name, and can refer to:

Blodwen, an opera by Joseph Parry
Blodwen, a character from The Lingo Show, a kids' TV show
Blodwen Peak, a peak in Antarctica

See also
"Blodwyn", a song from the Badfinger album No Dice